The AACTA Award for Best Cinematography is an award presented by the Australian Academy of Cinema and Television Arts (AACTA), a non-profit organisation whose aim is to "identify, award, promote and celebrate Australia's greatest achievements in film and television." The award is presented at the annual AACTA Awards, which hand out accolades for achievements in feature film, television, documentaries and short films. From 1976 to 2010, the category was presented by the Australian Film Institute (AFI), the Academy's parent organisation, at the annual Australian Film Institute Awards (known as the AFI Awards). When the AFI launched the Academy in 2011, it changed the annual ceremony to the AACTA Awards, with the current award being a continuum of the AFI Award for Best Cinematography.

Best Cinematography was first presented in 1976 Australian Film Institute Awards with the winner being chosen by the Australian Cinematographers Society (ACS). The award is presented to the cinematographer of a film that is Australian-made, or with a significant amount of Australian content. Russell Boyd, Peter James, Donald McAlpine and Geoffrey Simpson have won the award three times each, more than any other cinematographer. Boyd has received the most nominations with nine.

Winners and nominees
In the following table, the years listed correspond to the year of film release; the ceremonies are usually held the same year. The cinematographer in yellow background have won the award. Those that are neither highlighted nor in bold are the nominees. When sorted chronologically, the table always lists the winning cinematographer first and then the other nominees.

Further reading

Notes

A: From 1958-2010, the awards were held during the year of the films release. However, the first AACTA Awards were held in 2012 for films released in 2011.

References

External links
 Official website of the Australian Academy of Cinema and Television Arts

Cinematography
Awards for best cinematography
Lists of films by award
Awards established in 1976
1976 establishments in Australia